Hong Kong Executive Council was reshuffled from 24 to 25 June 2021, the second in the Chief Executive term of Carrie Lam, and the first after National Security Law was imposed. John Lee, the Secretary for Security and a former police, was promoted to Chief Secretary.

Background 
Following the anti-government protests started in 2019, Chief Executive Carrie Lam reshuffled her cabinet in the first time in 2020 but the popularity of the government remained low. National Security Law was imposed some months after the reshuffle, which effectively silenced dissidents in the city. The suppression against pro-democracy camp, mainly led by hawks in the cabinet, grew in 2021, including the arrest and trial of leading activists, along with the forced closure of Apple Daily.

In the morning on 24 June 2021, local online media HK01 claimed the Chief Secretary for Administration Matthew Cheung could soon be replaced. Later that day, multiple local media outlets, cited sources, reported the cabinet will be reshuffled after a cabinet meeting in the morning. Secretary for Security John Lee will be promoted to Chief Secretary and Commissioner of Police Chris Tang will take on the post of Security. Then Chief Secretary Matthew Cheung, aged 70, will therefore retire. Hong Kong Government announced the reshuffle on 25 June after Chinese State Council approved the new appointments and removal.

Cabinet-level changes 
Non-principal officials are italicised.

Reactions 
Matthew Cheung, after more than four years as Chief Secretary, said in a statement that it has been true honour and privilege to serve Hong Kong for nearly 50 years. He wished that Hong Kong would maintain its long-term stability and prosperity, and all citizens of Hong Kong good health and happiness.

John Lee, a former police, was promoted from Security Secretary to Chief Secretary, becoming the first after handover of Hong Kong in 1997 and the second in the history of Hong Kong, that a former security personnel became the second-in-command (William Caine, first head of Police Force was appointed as Colonial Secretary, equivalent to now Chief Secretary, in 1846), as nearly all of his predecessors were administrative officials. The appointment was relatively surprising as rumours believed Carrie Lam-favoured Patrick Nip, then Civil Service Secretary and former Constitutional Secretary, would be raised to succeed Cheung.

The two new cabinet ministers were the leading figures in cracking down the protests, and had been sanctioned by the United States in August 2020 for undermining Hong Kong's autonomy. The new cabinet signaled the dominance of the "hawks" and that the government will continue the hardline attitude. Some concerned the reshuffle could transform Hong Kong into a "police state".

On 27 June 2021, Lee became the acting Chief Executive after Carrie Lam departed Hong Kong to attend celebrations of the 100th anniversary of the Chinese Communist Party in Beijing, only four days after Lee's promotion. John Lee would later become the chairman of Candidate Eligibility Review Committee, responsible for vetting election candidates.

References 

Hong Kong national security law
2021 in Hong Kong
Cabinet reshuffles